Mahesh Elkunchwar (born 9 October 1939) is an Indian playwright and screenplay writer in Marathi language with more than 20 plays to his name, in addition to his theoretical writings, critical works, and his active work in India's Parallel Cinema as actor and screenwriter. Today along with Vijay Tendulkar,  he is credited as one of the most influential and progressive playwrights not just in Marathi theatre, but also in Indian theatre. In 2014, he was awarded the Sangeet Natak Akademi Fellowship, the highest honour in performing arts in India.

Early life and education
Born to a 9th generation Telugu Brahmin migrant family in Parwa village in Vidarbha region of Maharashtra, at the age of four he had to leave his parents and leave a city where he grew up a lonely child and hardly interested in studies, and raised outside of Indian urban centres. As films and theatre were taboo in his family, he saw his first play when he moved to Nagpur for his matriculation. Here he studied at Morris College, and went on to do M.A. in English from Nagpur University. While still in college came the turning point in his life, when one day he went to watch a film and unable to get a movie ticket, he ended up watching a play. That play was a veteran theatre director Vijaya Mehta's production of Vijay Tendulkar's Mee jinkalo mee Haralo (I Won, I Lost) in 1965. Deeply influenced by the play, he went to watch play again the following day and decided to write plays. He devoted the next year to reading plays of all kind.

Career
He taught English literature at Dharampeth Arts, Commerce College, Nagpur and M. P. Deo Memorial Science College, Nagpur, until retiring as its Head in 1999. He was a guest professor of screen play-writing at the Film and Television Institute, Pune in 2000–2001. He taught as a visiting professor at the National school of Drama, New Delhi for a number of years.

Elkunchwar has experimented with many forms of dramatic expression, ranging from the realistic to symbolic, expressionist to absurd theatre with theme ranging from creativity to life, sterility to death and has influenced modern Indian theatre for more than three decades. Elkunchwar emerged onto the national theatre scene with the publication of his one-act play Sultan in 1967 in noted literary magazine Satyakatha. This play was immediately noticed by Vijaya Mehta; she went on to direct four of his early plays, including Holi and Sultan in 1969 and 1970 for Rangayan. A number of commercial hits followed such as Holi (1969), Raktapushpa (1971), Party (1972), Virasat (1982), and Atamkatha (1987).

Considered a successor to Vijay Tendulkar, Elkunchwar's plays are written in Marathi, the Indian language that is spoken by approximately 90 million people. The plays have been subsequently translated into multiple Indian and Western languages (including English, French and German).

In 1984, his play Holi was made into the film Holi by Ketan Mehta, for which he wrote the screenplay. In the same year, Govind Nihalani directed a film, Party, based on his eponymous play. Sonata (2017), a film starring Aparna Sen, Shabana Azmi and Lilette Dubey was based on Elkunchwar's eponymous play.

A lesser known fact about him is as Mahesh Elkunchwar, the essayist. His collection of essays 'Maunraag' has broken new grounds in this genre and was considered the book of the decade in 2012. An uncanny blend of autobiographical and meditative, His essay show his erudition and a vivid imagination.

Plays by Mahesh Elkunchwar

 Rudravarsha (The Savage Year), 1966
 Sultan (one act), 1967
 Zumbar (one act), 1967
 Eka Mhatarachya Khoon (An Old Man's Murder, one act), 1968
 Kaifiyat (one act), 1967
 Ek Osad Gaon (one act), 1969
 Yatanaghar (The Chamber of Anguish), 1970
 Garbo, 1970
 Vasanakand (The Episode of Lust), 1972
 Magna talyakathi
 Party, 1976
 Wada Chirebandi (Old Stone Mansion), 1985
 Pratibimb (Reflection), 1987
 Atmakatha (Autobiography), 1988
 Magna Talyakathi (The Pond), 1991
 Yuganta (The End of an Age)
 Wasanani Jeernani (Tattered Clothes), 1995
 Dharmaputra (Godson), 1998
 Sonata, 2000
 Eka Natacha Mrityu (An Actor's Death), 2005
 Raktapushp

Other works:

 Maunraag : collection of essays, Mouj Prakashan
 Paschimprabha : collection of essays, Chakshu prakashan
 Baatcheet : Interviews, Rajhans Prakashan 
 Saptak : lectures, Rajhans prakashan 
 Tribandh : Three essays, Mouj Prakashan
 Vinashavela ( translation ) Mouj Prakashan

Awards and recognition
Elkunchwar's plays have gained national and international critical attention, and his growing body of work has become part of India's post-colonial theatrical canon. 
Some Important Honours, Awards  :

 Sangeet Natak Academi Award – 1989
 Nandikar-1989 
 Maharashtra  Gaurav –1990
 Maharashtra  Foundation for ‘Yugant” –1997 
 Sahitya Akademi Award for his Trilogy Yugant
 Saraswati  Samman -2002
Janasthan 2011
 Brittingham Visiting Scholar, University of Wisconsin, Madison, USA in 2005 
 Sangeet Natak Akademi Fellowship2013
 Kalidas Samman 2014-2015
 Go. Ni. Dandekar Puraskar 2016
 Vinda Karandikar Jeevan Gaurav Puraskar- 2018

Works in translations :
 

Collected Plays of Mahesh Elkunchwar Volume I: Oxford University Press 2008

Collected Plays of Mahesh Elkunchwar Volume II : Oxford University Press 2011

References

External links
 

1939 births
Living people
Indian male dramatists and playwrights
Marathi-language writers
Recipients of the Saraswati Samman Award
Recipients of the Sangeet Natak Akademi Award
Recipients of the Sahitya Akademi Award in Marathi
Marathi theatre
Writers from Nagpur
Maharashtra academics
Dramatists and playwrights from Maharashtra
20th-century Indian dramatists and playwrights
20th-century Indian male writers
Recipients of the Sangeet Natak Akademi Fellowship